Nyköping Municipality  held a municipal election on 9 September 2018, on the same day as the general and regional elections.

Results
The number of seats remained at 61 with the Social Democrats winning the most at 20, a drop of two from 2014.

By constituency

Urban and rural votes

Percentage share

By votes

Elected

Electoral wards
There were three constituencies, the Eastern, Northern and Western. The number of late-incoming postal ballots were 704 or 1.9% of the total ballots cast.

Nyköping

Rural areas

References

Nyköping municipal elections
Nyköping